Hehua Subdistrict ( Literally means "Lotus") is an urban subdistrict in Liuyang City, Hunan Province, People's Republic of China. The subdistrict is bordered to the north by Guankou Subdistrict, to the northeast by Gaoping Town, to the southeast by Chengtanjiang Town, to the northwest by Jili Subdistrict, to the southwest by Chengchong Town, and to the south by Dayao Town.

Administrative division
The subdistrict is divided into eight villages and three communities, the following areas: 
 Hehuayuan Community
 Tangzhou Community
 Nanshi Community
 Yangjianong Village
 Niushiling Village
 Nanhuan Village
 Xihuan Village
 Sitong Village
 Donghuan Village
 Liuhe Village
 Jianxin Village

Geography

Zhangcao Reservoir is the largest reservoir and largest water body in the town.

Liuyang River, also known as the mother river, flows through the subdistrict.

Economy
The economy is supported primarily by commerce and aquatic products industry.

Education
 Hehua Middle School
 Jinshalu School

Hospital
 Liuyang No. 7 Hospital

Transportation
The South Bus station is situated at the subdistrict.

National Highway
The subdistrict is connected to two national highways: G319 and G106.

Expressway
The Changsha–Liuyang Expressway, from Changsha, running northwest to southeast through the subdistrict to Jiangxi.

Railway
The Liling–Liuyang railway, passes across the subdistrict northwest to southeast. A railway stations is settled: Gujia.
This branch was removed in 2004.

Attractions

The main attractions are the Tomb of Tan Sitong, Ouyang Yuqian Grand Theater and Ancestral Temple of Ouyang Xuan.

Tianmashan Park or Tianma Mountain Park is a public and urban park in the subdistrict.

Liuyang River Wetland Park situated at the subdistrict.

Notable people
 Ouyang Xuan (1283–1358), scholar.

References

Divisions of Liuyang
Liuyang